WDIC-FM is a Classic Country formatted broadcast radio station licensed to Clinchco, Virginia, serving Clinchco, Clintwood and Grundy in Virginia.  WDIC-FM is owned and operated by Dickenson County Broadcasting Corporation.

References

External links
92.1 The Wolf Online

1989 establishments in Virginia
Classic country radio stations in the United States
Radio stations established in 1989
DIC-FM